Keith Scholey (born 24 June 1957 in Dar es Salaam, Tanzania) is a British producer of nature documentaries for television and cinema, and a former television executive.  He is the joint series producer of the Netflix original documentary series Our Planet, the joint director and executive producer of David Attenborough: A Life on Our Planet, and executive producer of Breaking Boundaries: The Science of Our Planet.  He is the executive producer of the 2021 BBC / Discovery series A Perfect Planet, The Mating Game and The Earthshot Prize: Repairing Our Planet.  He also co-directed African Cats, Bears, and Dolphin Reef with Alastair Fothergill for Disneynature, and is also the executive producer of the series North America for the Discovery Channel.

Career

Scholey graduated from Bristol University with a degree in zoology in 1978 and subsequently completed a PhD in zoology at the same university. In 1983, he began working as a researcher at the BBC Natural History Unit on David Attenborough's series The Living Planet.  He rose to become a producer in this BBC department, making programmes for The Natural World and Wildlife on One series as well as for Attenborough's award-winning series The Private Life of Plants. He also created and produced the original series of Big Cat Diary, which has continued for over a decade, began and series produced the Wildlife Specials and became the series editor of Wildlife on One.

In 1998, Scholey became the Head of the Natural History Unit. During his four and a half-year tenure, the NHU made the memorable David Attenborough series State of the Planet and The Life of Mammals, and also The Blue Planet, Andes to Amazon and Wild Africa.  The department also reinvented its live broadcasting creating The Abyss - Live and Springwatch.

In 2002, Scholey became the Controller of Specialist Factual for the BBC's Factual and Learning division. With responsibility for Science, Arts, Business, History, Religion as well as Natural History departments, he oversaw programmes with a range from landmark programming including, Auschwitz, Planet Earth, Egypt, Supervolcano and The Power of Art to the classic long-running series of Horizon, Timewatch, Natural World, and arena and live events including the funeral of Pope John Paul II.

In 2006, Scholey became the Controller of Factual Production for BBC Vision, with the responsibility for all BBC Factual in-house production. During this time, he oversaw the creation of The One Show, the biggest factual commission in the organisation's history. He was also the Deputy Chief Creative Officer for BBC Vision Productions, with responsibilities across all in-house TV production.  In 2008, he resigned from the BBC to pursue a career as an independent film director and television producer.

Scholey is currently a director of Silverback Films.  In recent years, he series produced Netflix’s Our Planet, is an executive producer for the  BBC / Discovery Channel series A Perfect Planet and The Mating Game, and is a director of David Attenborough: A Life on Our Planet.  He has also directed and produced three feature films for Disneynature, African Cats (2011), Bears (2014) and Dolphin Reef (2020).(6) He was also the executive producer on the Discovery Channel series North America (2013) and Deadly Islands. He is currently the joint director of Silverback Films with Alastair Fothergill. [6]

Scholey was made a Doctor of Science (DSc) in 2001, by the University of Bristol for his contribution to the public and to biological sciences. He is a trustee of Wildscreen. Scholey is a qualified SCUBA diver and pilot.

Programme Credits

Directing and producing
African Cats (2011)
Bears (2014)
Dolphin Reef (2020)

Executive Producer
The Earthshot Prize: Repairing Our Planet (2021)
Breaking Boundaries: The Science of Our Planet (2021)
A Perfect Planet (2021)
The Mating Game (2021)
North America (2013)

Producer
Polar Bear (2022)
Penguins (2019)
Big Cat Diary (1996)
Natural Neighbours: Invasion of the Tree Smashers (1996)
Dawn to Dusk: Elephant Back Safari (1996)
Wildlife on One: Reef Encounter (1996)
The Private Life of Plants (1995)
Wildlife on One: Malice in Wonderland (1994)
Natural World: Island of the Ghost Bear (1994)
Prisoners of the Sun (1992)
Natural World: Running for their Lives (1990)
Wildlife on One: Haunted Huntress (1990)
Natural World: Island in the Air (1989)
The Great Rift (1988)

Series Editor
Wildlife on One (1994 to 1997)
Wildlife Specials (1997)
Nature Specials (1997)

References

External links
Silverback Films 
Disney: African Cats www.disney.com/africancats
Wild Horizons www.wildhorizonsltd.com

1957 births
Living people
British television producers
Alumni of the University of Bristol
People educated at Reed's School